Timothy Gallagher may refer to:

 Timothy Gallagher (born 1953), priest and author
 Timothy Gallagher (politician) (1840–1888), New Zealand politician

See also
 Tim Gallagher (disambiguation)